Charles James Hogarth (1869-1945) was a British soldier and prolific translator from Russian, who wrote as C. J. Hogarth. He translated work by writers including Dostoevsky, Tolstoy, Gogol, Turgenev, Maxim Gorky, Ivan Goncharov, Ivan Shmelev, Ivan Nazhivin, V. O. Klyuchevsky, Henryk Sienkiewicz and Alexandra Kollontai.

Life
Hogarth was born on 7 December 1869, and educated at Charterhouse School. He joined the Highland Light Infantry in 1890, but retired in 1891. In 1900-1901 he fought in the Second Boer War for the 1st Railway Pioneer Regiment, Scott's Sharpshooters and the Cape Special Police. By 1904 he was living in Scarborough.

He died on 5 April 1945.

Reception
Semion Rapoport caustically noted the propagandistic tone, "in the best style of the year 1914", of Hogarth's translation of Ivan Shmelev's The Sun of the Dead (1927), which anachronistically substituted "German hordes" for Shmelev's "German". Rapoport was also severe in his criticism of a 1915 translation of Gogol's Dead Souls (a credit sometimes printed as "D. J. Hogarth"):

Hogarth's version of V. O. Klyuchevsky's five-volume History of Russia has been called "a very poor English translation". His 1915 translation of Goncharov's Oblomov "sounds very British and contains inaccuracies.

Selected translations 

 Tolstoy: Childhood, Boyhood, and Youth (1912)
 Dostoevsky: Letters from the Underworld (1913)
 Sienkiewicz: Quo Vadis? (1914)
 Goncharov: Oblomov (1915)
 Gogol: Dead Souls (Dent, 1915)
 Gogol: Taras Bulba and Other Stories (Dent, 1918)
 Turgenev: Fathers and Sons (1921)
 Gorky: Through Russia (1921)
 Klyuchevsky: A History of Russia (1926)
 Shmelev: The Sun of the Dead (1927)
 Nazhivin: Rasputin (1929)
 Kollontai: Free Love (1932)

References

1869 births
1945 deaths
People educated at Charterhouse School
British colonial army officers
British translators
Russian–English translators
Translators of Fyodor Dostoyevsky
Translators of Leo Tolstoy